Boogie Bunnies is a match-3 puzzle game developed by Artech Studios for the Xbox 360's Xbox Live Arcade service and Windows. The game features same machine and Xbox Live co-op multiplayer.

Reception

The Xbox 360 version received "mixed" reviews according to the review aggregation website Metacritic.

TeamXbox said, "Despite a few bungled dance steps here and there, Boogie Bunnies is still a strangely addictive experience." IGN criticized the game, saying, "It does nothing different from the gaggle of puzzlers that are already out there and the old playstyles that it employs aren't nearly as fun as we'd hoped."

The Xbox 360 version was nominated for one Xbox Live Arcade 2008 award, "Best Family Game", which went to A Kingdom for Keflings.

See also
 AstroPop
 Puzzle Bobble

References

External links
 

2008 video games
Artech Studios games
Multiplayer and single-player video games
Puzzle video games
Video games developed in Canada
Windows games
Xbox 360 Live Arcade games